The Busan National University of Education is a government-supported institution which provides training for future public-school teachers in South Korea.  The campus is located in the Yeonje-gu district of Busan Metropolitan City.  The university offers graduate and undergraduate programs, and enrolls 1,762 undergraduate and 565 graduate students.  A primary-level lab school with an enrollment of 768 students is located on the campus.  The university's current president, its third, is Sung-Taek Park.

Academic departments

Undergraduate
Education
Ethics education
Korean language education
Social studies education
Mathematics education
Science education
Physical education
Music education
Fine arts education
Practical arts education
Early childhood education
English education
Computer education

History

The school was established shortly after national liberation, on September 2, 1946.  At the time it was known as Busan Normal School (부산사범학교) and provided training for elementary-school teachers.  It was expanded to cover secondary teachers in 1955, and became Busan Teachers' College.  In 1961, it was reorganized and renamed as Busan National College of Education.  It became a four-year college in 1981, and a university in 1993.  The graduate school was established in 1996.

Sister universities
BNUE maintains sisterhood relationships with six universities in four countries:  Australia's Central Queensland University, China's Hangzhou Teachers College, Japan's Shimane University and Fukuoka University of Education, and the USA's Oklahoma State University and Shenandoah University.

See also
List of national universities in South Korea
List of universities and colleges in South Korea
Education in Korea

External links
Official school website, in Korean and English

Universities and colleges in Busan
National universities of education in South Korea
Educational institutions established in 1946
1946 establishments in Korea